The Garden Society of Gothenburg is a park and horticultural garden in central Gothenburg, Sweden. It is located next to Kungsportsavenyen.

The park was founded in 1842 by King Carl XIV Johan, on initiative of the amateur botanist Henric Elof von Normann.

In the park there is an acclaimed rose garden with some 4,000 roses of 1,900 species. The rose garden has been awarded stars in the Michelin Green Guide.
There is also a 19th-century palm house, greenhouses, sculptures, a restaurant and cafés.

It is one of the best preserved 19th century parks in Sweden.

Notes and references

External links

 Homepage of Trädgårdsföreningen in English

Parks in Gothenburg
1842 establishments in Sweden
Avenyn
Rose gardens
Horticultural organizations
Horticulture in Sweden
Listed buildings in Gothenburg